The Verkehrsverbund Rhein-Ruhr, abbreviated VRR, is a public transport association (Verkehrsverbund) in the German state of North Rhine-Westphalia. It covers most of the Ruhr area, as well as neighbouring parts of the Lower Rhine region, including Düsseldorf and thus large parts of the Rhine-Ruhr conurbation.

Structure and responsibilities 
The VRR is tasked with coordinating public transport in its area. This means the following:

 setting and developing the fare system (“VRR-Tarif”)
 redistributing ticket revenue onto the transport companies
 coordinating local train services (Schienenpersonennahverkehr, SPNV) within its area as public service obligations (PSO)
 integrating the public transport system
 setting standards and guidelines for passenger information and bus/tram stop facilities
 coordination between transport companies, local authorities and Land authorities
 financing partial subsidies for bus and tram companies according to § 11 (2) and § 11a ÖPNVG NRW
 coordinating Land subsidies to transport companies and local authorities according to § 12 and § 13 ÖPNVG NRW

Governance 
Officially, 24 cities and districts form the Zweckverband VRR (ZV VRR), and an additional 2 districts the Nahverkehrs-Zweckverband Niederrhein (NVN). Together, the ZV VRR and the NVN form the Verkehrsverbund Rhein-Ruhr AöR, which in addition cooperates with further transport companies.

The member cities and districts of the Zweckverband VRR (ZV VRR) are:

 cities of Bochum, Bottrop, Dortmund, Duisburg, Düsseldorf, Essen, Gelsenkirchen, Hagen, Herne, Krefeld, Mönchengladbach, Monheim, Mülheim, Neuss, Oberhausen, Remscheid, Solingen, Viersen, and Wuppertal
 districts of Ennepe-Ruhr, Mettmann, Recklinghausen, Rhein-Kreis Neuss and Viersen

The members of the Nahverkehrs-Zweckverband Niederrhein (NVN) are the districts of Kleve and Wesel.

The municipal and district councils send representatives to the two Zweckverband councils (Verbandsversammlung), which in turn elect the main decision making body, the administrative council (Verwaltungsrat) of the VRR AöR, and other committees. The Verwaltungsrat elects the administrative board of the VRR AöR (Vorstand), currently Ronald R.F. Lünser and José Luis Castrillo.

In addition, there are departments within the VRR dealing with different matters, such as marketing or law. Two Land institutions are located within the VRR structure: Kompetenzcenter Digitalisierung NRW (KCD) and Kompetenzcenter Sicherheit (KCS).

Through the ZV VRR Eigenbetrieb Fahrzeuge und Infrastruktur (ZV VRR FaIn-EB), the VRR also buys and/or owns the rolling stock for some, but not all, of its PSO rail operations.

Transport companies 
These above mentioned cities’ and districts’ and other associated transport companies thus operate under the VRR fare scheme:

 Bahnen der Stadt Monheim (BSM)
 Bochum-Gelsenkirchener Straßenbahnen (Bogestra)
 Busverkehr Rheinland (BVR), operating as “DB Rheinlandbus”
 Dortmunder Stadtwerke (DSW21)
 Duisburger Verkehrsgesellschaft (DVG)
 Flughafen Düsseldorf
 Hagener Straßenbahn (HST)
 Kraftverkehr Schwalmtal (KVS)
 Kreisverkehrsgesellschaft Mettmann (KVGM)
 LOOK Busreisen
 Niederrheinische Verkehrsbetriebe (NIAG)
 NEW mobil und aktiv Mönchengladbach (NEW Möbus)
 NEW mobil und aktiv Viersen (NEW Viersen)
 Rheinbahn
 Ruhrbahn
 StadtBus Dormagen
 Stadtwerke Goch
 Stadtwerke Kevelaer
 Stadtwerke Krefeld (SWK)
 Stadtwerke Neuss (SWN)
 Stadtwerke Oberhausen (STOAG)
 Stadtwerke Remscheid (SR)
 Stadtwerke Solingen (SWS)
 Straßenbahn Herne – Castrop-Rauxel (HCR)
 Verkehrsgesellschaft der Stadt Velbert (VGV)
 Verkehrsgesellschaft Ennepe-Ruhr (VER)
 Verkehrsgesellschaft Hilden
 Vestische Straßenbahnen
 Wuppertaler Stadtwerke (WSW)

The following rail companies operate S-Bahn or regional train services in the VRR area and accept VRR tickets:

 Abellio Rail NRW
 DB Regio
 Keolis Deutschland, operating as “eurobahn”
 National Express Rail
 NordWestBahn
 Regiobahn
 Train Rental
 VIAS Rail

Line numbering scheme 
With the introduction of the VRR in 1980 a new line numbering system for all bus, tram and Stadtbahn lines in the VRR area was introduced. The VRR was divided into ten regions, which were assigned a prefix digit (e.g. 4 for Dortmund), the first digit in the three-digit line number representing that prefix. The last two digits are the individual line number. These are the existing prefixes:
 1: Essen and Mülheim
 2: Kreis Recklinghausen, Bottrop and northern Gelsenkirchen
 3: Bochum, southern Gelsenkirchen, parts of the Ennepe-Ruhr-Kreis and Herne
 4: Dortmund
 5: Hagen and main part of the Ennepe-Ruhr-Kreis
 6: Wuppertal, Solingen and Remscheid
 7: Düsseldorf and Kreis Mettmann
 8: Düsseldorf and Rhein-Kreis Neuss
 9: Duisburg and Oberhausen
 0: Mönchengladbach, Krefeld and Kreis Viersen
 no prefix: Kreis Kleve and Kreis Wesel

Stadtbahn lines are identified with the prefix "U" followed by the prefix and a one-digit identifiers. The prefixes 2, 5, 9 and 0 are not used for Stadtbahn lines. The Wuppertal Schwebebahn is officially line 60, but because it does not run underground, the U prefix is not used.

After the integration of the former Verkehrsgemeinschaft Niederrhein (VGN) area north of Duisburg, route numbers were unchanged, i.e. representing no prefix.
 Express buses are called Schnellbus and have the prefix SB followed by a two-digit-number. None of these numbers is a key number.
 Semi-fast buses are called City-Express and have the prefix CE followed by a two-digit-number. As with the Schnellbusse none of these numbers is a key number.
 Taxi buses are AST – AnrufSammelTaxi or ALT – AnrufLinienTaxi or Taxibus
 In some cities the local buses have an own numbering system, e.g. the buses in Velbert are called Ortsbus, their line number consists of an OV followed by a one- or two-digit number.
 In some cities the night buses are called NachtExpress – NE
, the VRR network consists of 1098 lines, of which there are: 
 in regional rail
 12 S-Bahn lines (see: Rhine-Ruhr S-Bahn)
 20 Regional-Express lines (see: List of regional railway lines in North Rhine-Westphalia)
 19 Regionalbahn lines (see: List of regional railway lines in North Rhine-Westphalia)
in urban rail
 15 Stadtbahn light rail lines (see: Rhine-Ruhr Stadtbahn)
 45 tram lines
 1 Schwebebahn line (in Wuppertal)
 2 H-Bahn peoplemover systems made up of three lines (two H-Bahn lines in Dortmund, and the Düsseldorf SkyTrain at Düsseldorf airport)
 in buses
 1030 bus lines
 6 trolleybus lines (in Solingen)
290,988 train and bus km per year
 15,300 km of route network (bus, light rail, and train)
 11,500 stops

History 

In 2004, roughly 1 billion trips were made by way of the VRR network.

See also 
 Rhine-Ruhr Stadtbahn
 Bochum Stadtbahn (BOGESTRA)
 Dortmund Stadtbahn
 Düsseldorf Stadtbahn (see also: Rheinbahn)
 Essen: Public Transport (incl. Essen Stadtbahn)

References

External links 

 Verkehrsverbund Rhein-Ruhr (VRR) – official site 
 Verkehrsverbund Rhein-Ruhr (VRR) – official site 

Transport associations in Germany
Transport in North Rhine-Westphalia
Ruhr
Companies based in North Rhine-Westphalia
Companies based in Gelsenkirchen
Transport in Gelsenkirchen
1980 establishments in West Germany
Companies established in 1980